Good Day L.A. is an American morning television news and entertainment program airing on KTTV (channel 11), a Fox owned-and-operated television station in Los Angeles, California, owned by the Fox Television Stations subsidiary of Fox Corporation. The program broadcasts each weekday morning from 4 a.m. to 11 a.m. Pacific Time. The program features news, traffic, weather, and entertainment segments (including celebrity interviews, which are mainly done in studio, but occasionally via satellite). The program also features weekly segments on finance, tech, wellness, and food.

History
Good Day L.A. debuted on June 18, 1993. At its inception, it was a two-hour newscast utilizing the then-traditional "overnight headlines and traffic/weather" morning news format, originally anchored by Antonio Mora and Susan Lichtman. Mark Thompson moved from the station's 10 p.m. newscast to serve as its weather anchor; Dagny Hultgreen served as the entertainment anchor; and Suzanne Dunn was the traffic reporter, reporting from the station's news helicopter Sky 11 (now SkyFox). A weekend public affairs show with the same name aired during the 1980s.

The format was unsuccessful, and the show had suffered from frequent anchor turnover. Mora left for ABC News and was replaced by Thompson and later Tony McEwing (who has anchored the early morning Fox 11 Morning News since its 1993 launch). Hultgreen was replaced by Lonnie Lardner, and Dunn was replaced by Will Kohlschreiber.

The show was retooled in March 1995 when Steve Edwards was brought in as anchor alongside Jillian Barberie as weather anchor (swapping positions with Thompson, who returned to reporting weather on the station's 10 p.m. newscast), and Dorothy Lucey handling the entertainment reports; Rod Bernsen took over the traffic reports from the helicopter, and McEwing reported headlines from the newsroom.

In mid-2012, the show saw its first major lineup change in nearly two decades with the departure of Lucey, whose contract was not renewed in May. Around the same time, Reynolds was offered to work on a freelance basis and began appearing less frequently on the program. Unsatisfied with the demotion, Reynolds chose to leave completely in September of that year. At the same time of Reynolds' departure, frequent guest host Maria Sansone was made a full-time co-host of the program, alongside Edwards. The two were later joined by Araksya Karapetyan as a third host/anchor with regular contributions from Lisa Breckenridge, Marla Tellez, and Tony McEwing.

Breckenridge and Sansone were unceremoniously let go in January 2017. For a short period, the broadcast was hosted by Edwards and Karapetyan before the latter was moved to the station's early morning newscast. Liz Habib then joined as the show's new co-anchor. On December 4, 2017, Megan Colarossi joined the show, replacing Habib as the new co-anchor alongside Edwards, who returned as a sports anchor. The teaming lasted just one week, as Edwards was let go by KTTV.

Good Day Live
In 2001, Good Day L.A. spun off a nationally syndicated program called Good Day Live, an hour-long version of the local show with the same hosts; the program, which featured the same format as Good Day L.A. (although with more of an emphasis on entertainment news, interviews, and feature stories rather than news headlines), was distributed by 20th Television and was originally launched on the Fox Television Stations, the parent of KTTV which operates Fox's owned-and-operated stations. Jillian Barberie was fired from the show and Dorothy Lucey left the syndicated version in 2004, yet both continued to host the L.A.-based version. They were replaced by Arthel Neville and Debbie Matenopoulos. Good Day Live was canceled a year later due to low ratings.

Expansion to three hours
Following the cancelation of Good Day Live, KTTV expanded Good Day L.A. to three hours, running until 10 a.m. local time (becoming the first Fox-owned station, and one of the earliest stations not affiliated with the Big Three networks, to expand their morning newscast into the 9 a.m. hour). Also in 2005, Good Day L.A. added a Sunday edition that was hosted by Robb Weller, Nischelle Turner and Elizabeth Espinosa (in July 2006, the Good Day L.A. branding was removed from the Sunday edition and the format was changed to a more straightforward newscast; Turner and Espinosa were reassigned to other news programs, but Weller remained and co-anchored the Sunday morning newscast with Gina Silva until that program was cancelled by the end of the decade).

Expansion to five and a half hours
KTTV expanded Good Day L.A. to five and a half hours on December 10, 2018, incorporating the early morning newscast that began at 4:30 a.m. into the show. The 4:30 a.m. to 7:30 a.m. portion is anchored by Araksya Karapetyan & Tony McEwing. The 7:30 a.m.-10a.m. portion is hosted by Elex Michaelson, Megan Colarossi, Rita Garcia, Vanessa Borge, weather anchor Maria Quiban, entertainment reporter Julie Chang, and traffic reporters Rick Dickert and Soumada Khan.

On March 4, 2019, Good Day L.A. changed its anchor lineup. The 4:30 a.m. to 6 a.m. portion is hosted by Dan Cohen and Rita Garcia; the 6 a.m. to 9 a.m. portion is hosted by Araksya Karapetyan and Tony McEwing; and the 9 a.m. to 10 a.m. portion is hosted by Megan Colarossi and Vanessa Borge.

Expansion to six hours
KTTV expanded Good Day L.A. to six hours on April 1, 2019.

Expansion to seven hours
KTTV expanded Good Day L.A. to seven hours in September 2022.

Notable personalities

Current on-air staff

Anchors
Araksya Karapetyan: 9 a.m.–11 a.m. host/reporter
 Soumada Khan: 4 a.m.–7 a.m. weather anchor/4 a.m.–10 a.m. traffic anchor
 Melvin Robert: 6 a.m.–9 a.m. host/reporter
 Jennifer Lahmers: 6 a.m.–9 a.m. host/reporter 
 Stu Mundel: SkyFox reporter 
Maria Quiban: 7 a.m.–11 a.m. weather/social media anchor
 Amanda Salas: entertainment anchor 
 Brooke Thomas: 4 a.m.–6 a.m.  host/reporter
 Bob DeCastro: 4 a.m.–6 a.m.  host/reporter 
 Sandra Endo: 9 a.m.–11 a.m. host/reporter

Reporters
 Gigi Graciette : field reporter
 Mario Ramirez: reporter
 Gina Silva: reporter

Former on-air staff
 Lisa Breckenridge : entertainment and lifestyle correspondent
 Dan Cohen: host
 Steve Edwards: host and news/opinion anchor
 Dorothy Lucey : co-host/entertainment reporter
 Lisa McRee : fill-in anchor
 Jillian Barberie : co-host/weather anchor
 Lauren Sánchez : entertainment reporter
 Maria Sansone : co-host and news anchor
 Mark Thompson : weather reporter
 Elex Michaelson: co-host and news anchor (now anchor, KTTV FOX 11 News at 5, 6, 7, & 10 p.m.)
 Megan Colarossi: co-host/reporter
Julie Chang: entertainment anchor
 Rick Dickert: weather/traffic anchor (now chief meteorologist, KTTV FOX 11 News at 5, 6, & 10 p.m.)
 Tony McEwing: host/reporter
 Rita Garcia: host/reporter
 Vanessa Borge: host/reporter
 Michaela Pereira: host/reporter

KTTV morning newscasts
The station's early morning newscast, Fox 11 Morning News, premiered alongside Good Day L.A. in June 1993; it was originally anchored by Diana Koricke and Tony McEwing, with veteran KTTV reporter and former anchor Tony Valdez serving as an occasional fill-in anchor. Koricke left television news in June 1996 and was replaced on the broadcast by Jean Martirez (who joined the station from KCNC-TV in Denver). The show originated as an hour-long newscast beginning at 6 a.m., but was later expanded to 90 minutes, with a 5:30 a.m. start time. In 2004, an additional half-hour was added, expanding the morning newscast to two hours beginning at 5 a.m. (long after many other stations around the country, particularly in markets as large as Los Angeles, expanded their morning newscasts into the 5 a.m. slot). The morning newscast was expanded to 4:30 a.m. in April 2010.

On July 14, 2008, KTTV debuted a half-hour late morning newscast that immediately follows Good Day L.A. at 10:00 a.m. The program is currently anchored by McEwing and Araksya Karapetyan. In December of that year, a half-hour noon broadcast debuted on the station, which was reformatted in September 2011 from a traditional midday newscast to a mix of news and features with Good Day anchors Edwards and Sansone brought in to anchor the broadcast.

In December 2018, Good Day L.A expanded from a three-hour show starting at 7 a.m. to a five-and-a-half-hour show starting at 4:30 a.m.

On April 1, 2019, Good Day L.A. expanded to a six-hour show starting at 4 a.m.

In September 2022, Good Day L.A. expanded to a seven-hour show, running from 4 a.m. to 11 a.m.

Reception
Critics of Good Day L.A. have praised the show for being "so wonderfully bonkers", particularly in comparison with its competition, including KTLA's morning newscast as well as the national network morning shows seen on ABC, CBS, and NBC.

In other media
Clips from Good Day L.A. are frequently shown on the E! comedic television roundup series The Soup. The show features their logo and often showcases interviews or funny moments either in studio or from the field.  Clips from this show have appeared on late night talk shows like The Tonight Show and Jimmy Kimmel Live!

See also
Good Day New York: a similar morning news and entertainment program on sister station WNYW in New York City, New York.
KTLA Morning News: a competing morning news program on Los Angeles CW affiliate KTLA
Today in L.A.: a competing morning news program on Los Angeles NBC owned-and-operated station KNBC
Today in New York: a similar morning news program on New York NBC owned-and-operated station WNBC

References

External links
 

1993 American television series debuts
1990s American television news shows
2000s American television news shows
2010s American television news shows
2014 American television series endings
English-language television shows
Local news programming in the United States